The following is a list of managers of Sheffield Eagles Rugby League Football Club and their major honours. The list includes coaches of the first Sheffield Eagles founded in 1984 and the new club founded in 1999. Each manager's entry includes the dates of his tenure and honours won while under his care.

Coaches

Sheffield Eagles